Eros was an American quarterly political and literary magazine that published only four volumes in 1962. The New York Times described Eros as a “stunningly designed hardcover ‘magbook’,” covering “a wide swath of sexuality in history, politics, art and literature.” The magazine was the first product of Ralph Ginzburg and Herb Lubalin who later created two other influential magazines, namely Fact and Avant Garde.

History and profile
The first issue of the magazine appeared in Spring 1962. Ralph Ginzburg was the editor and Herb Lubalin was the art director of Eros which came out quarterly. The focus of the magazine was on love and sex during the dawning of the Sexual Revolution. It also covered articles on politics, arts and literature.

The third (Autumn, 1962) of a total of 4 issues of the magazine published featured the photographs of Marilyn Monroe just before her death which caused an obscenity lawsuit against Ginzburg by then U.S. Attorney General, Robert Kennedy. The magazine sold nearly 150,000 copies of this issue. The reason for the lawsuit was the claim that the magazine had violated federal anti-obscenity laws. Ginzburg was convicted and sentenced to five years in prison, but, he remained in prison for eight months. Following this incident the magazine was closed down.

In 2017 Mindy Seu created a website which contains the digital copies of Eros.

References

Defunct political magazines published in the United States
Magazines established in 1962
Magazines disestablished in 1962
Magazines published in New York City
Quarterly magazines published in the United States